is a Japanese actor who is represented by the talent agency, A-Team.

Biography
Warabino graduated from Miyazaki Prefectural Miyakonojō Technical High School. He debuted in 2006. In the year-end special of All-Star Thanksgiving, Warabino won the "Akasaka 5-chrome Mini Marathon" during his first appearance. On September 22, 2010, he was appointed as ambassador of Miyazaki Prefecture and served until March 31, 2012.

Filmography

TV series

Films

References

External links
 

21st-century Japanese male actors
1987 births
Living people
People from Miyazaki Prefecture
Japanese male television actors
Japanese male film actors